Puccinia oxalidis is a fungus species in the genus Puccinia. This species is a causal agent of rust on plants in the genus Oxalis, such as Oxalis articulata. The disease appears as yellow dots on the reverse of the leaves. The aecial stage can be found on Berberis repens.

See also 
 List of Puccinia species

References

External links 

oxalidis
Fungal plant pathogens and diseases
Fungi described in 1895